Charles Bryan is the name of:

Charles W. Bryan (1867–1945), Nebraska politician
Charles F. Bryan (1911–1955), American composer, musician, music educator and collector of folk music
Charles Henry Bryan (1822–1877), California politician
Charles Page Bryan (1856–1918), American diplomat
Charles S. Bryan (born 1942), American medical researcher and physician
Charlie Bryan (1933–2013), head of the International Association of Machinists union

See also
Charles O'Brien (disambiguation)
Charles Bryant (disambiguation)
Bryan (surname)